
Gmina Chorkówka is a rural gmina in Krosno County, Subcarpathian Voivodeship, in south-eastern Poland.

Villages
Gmina Chorkówka contains the villages and settlements of Bóbrka, Chorkówka, Draganowa, Faliszówka, Kobylany, Kopytowa, Leśniówka, Machnówka, Poraj, Sulistrowa, Świerzowa Polska, Szczepańcowa, Żeglce and Zręcin.

Neighbouring gminas
Gmina Chorkówka is bordered by the city of Krosno and by the gminas of Dukla, Jedlicze, Miejsce Piastowe, Nowy Żmigród and Tarnowiec.

References
Polish official population figures 2006

Chorkowka
Krosno County